Randy Avon (born September 25, 1940) is an American former politician in the state of Florida.

Avon was born in Honolulu, Hawaii and came to Florida in 1952. He attended the University of Florida and is a marketing and public relations executive. He served in the Florida House of Representatives from 1973 to 1976, as a Republican, representing the 88th district.

References

External links

Living people
1940 births
Republican Party members of the Florida House of Representatives
University of Florida alumni